Agapanthia osmanlis is a species of beetle in the family Cerambycidae. It was described by Reiche and Saulcy in 1858.

References

osmanlis
Beetles described in 1858